Lewis Ferry Moody (5 January 1880 – 21 February 1953) was an American engineer and professor, best known for the Moody chart, a diagram capturing relationships between several variables used in calculating fluid flow through a pipe. He has 23 patents for his inventions. He was the first Professor of Hydraulics in the School of Engineering at Princeton.

Biography 
He was born on 5 January 1880.

Lewis F. Moody as professor of fluid mechanics and machine design taught at Princeton University starting in 1930. He co-wrote the book Fifty Years’ Progress in Hydraulics with fellow engineer Blake R. Van Leer.

He married Eleanor Greene. His wife died in 1937. His daughter, Eleanor Lowry Moody, married in 1944. He was awarded the Elliott Cresson Medal in 1945.

He was awarded an Honorary Membership of the American Society of Mechanical Engineers (ASME) in 1951.

He died on 21 February 1953.

Legacy
Five years after his death, ASME created an Award to his honours: The Lewis F. Moody award, which is awarded for outstanding original papers useful to the practice of mechanical engineering by the Fluids Engineering Division (FED).

References

Further reading

1880 births
1953 deaths
Fluid dynamicists
20th-century American engineers